Lee Hye-ja (born 14 February 1947) is a South Korean athlete. She competed in the women's javelin throw at the 1964 Summer Olympics.

References

External links
 

1947 births
Living people
Athletes (track and field) at the 1964 Summer Olympics
South Korean female javelin throwers
Olympic athletes of South Korea
Place of birth missing (living people)